5-Hydroxyferulic acid is a hydroxycinnamic acid.

It is a precursor in the biosynthesis of sinapic acid. Phenylalanine is first converted to cinnamic acid by the action of the enzyme phenylalanine ammonia-lyase (PAL). A series of enzymatic hydroxylations and methylations leads to coumaric acid, caffeic acid, ferulic acid, 5-hydroxyferulic acid and sinapic acid.

Thus 5-hydroxyferulic acid is formed from ferulic acid by the action of the specific enzyme ferulate 5-hydroxylase (F5H).

References 

O-methylated hydroxycinnamic acids
Vinylogous carboxylic acids